Negwegon may refer to:

Alcona County, Michigan, named Negwegon County from 1840 to 1843
Negwegon State Park, a park in Michigan